Cox Mill High School is a comprehensive public high school in Concord, North Carolina.

History 
In 2006, Cabarrus County officials began looking for land in the western portion of the county for a high school that would alleviate the overcrowding at Northwest Cabarrus High School and Jay M. Robinson High School.  Land was found in the burgeoning Cox Mill area of Concord, near the Odell Community, approximately three miles from the Mecklenburg County line.

On October 8, 2007, the name "Cox Mill High School" was chosen by the Cabarrus County Board of Education over other candidates including "Odell High School", "West Winds High School", and "Bernie Edwards High School" (in honor of the longtime Northwest Cabarrus football coach and Concord mayor). Cabarrus schools superintendent Harold Winkler's name was also considered by the board, but Winkler himself asked that it be removed from consideration.

Cox Mill opened with 9th through 11th grades on August 25, 2009, and graduated its first senior class on June 11, 2011.

Other
During the COVID-19 quarantine in 2020, a group of students constructed a 1:1 scale model of the school in the video game Minecraft.

Notable alumni 
Leaky Black (class of 2018), college basketball player for the North Carolina Tar Heels
Wendell Moore Jr. (class of 2019), professional basketball player for the Minnesota Timberwolves
Matt Morgan (class of 2015), professional basketball player for Le Mans of the French Pro A

References

Public high schools in North Carolina
Schools in Cabarrus County, North Carolina
Educational institutions established in 2009
2009 establishments in North Carolina